Air vice-marshal Michael Keith Adams  (23 January 1934 – 30 August 2022) was a senior Royal Air Force officer.

Biography
Born on 23 January 1934, Michael Adams was educated at Bedford School. He joined the Royal Air Force in 1952. He became Air officer commanding Royal Air Force Training Units between 1983 and 1984, Assistant Chief of the Air Staff for Operational Requirements at the Ministry of Defence between 1984 and 1986, and Senior Directing Officer at the Royal College of Defence Studies between 1987 and 1988.

Adams was made a Companion of the Order of the Bath in the 1986 New Year Honours. He retired from the Royal Air Force in 1988.

Adams died on 30 August 2022, at the age of 88.

References

1934 births
2022 deaths
Place of birth missing
Companions of the Order of the Bath
People educated at Bedford School
Recipients of the Air Force Cross (United Kingdom)
Royal Air Force air marshals